Jean Pond Miner Coburn (1866–1967) was born in Menasha, Wisconsin. She studied at the Art Institute of Chicago, and is most notable for her work Forward.

Early life  
Jean Pond Miner was born in Menasha, Wisconsin on the 8th July 1866. Her parents were Rev. H. A. Miner, a Congregationalist clergyman and Harriet Pond Rice. In her early life the family moved to Madison, Wisconsin. During her education she was known among her classmates as a strong artist. After two years as a special student in Downer College, she went to Chicago and began her art studies at the Art Institute of Chicago with Lorado Taft, where she found particular interest in sculpture. After working only three months she took the second honors of the institution. Soon after, she was sought as an instructor, and at the end of the year accepted a position as student teacher.

Work 
Her statue Hope was among the first that met with recognition and was placed in the McCowen Oral School, in Englewood, Chicago. The woman's art club (also known as The Palette Club) recognized her work and conferred upon her the honor of active membership, and her figure Wisconsin was locally celebrated. Her group especially prepared for the 1893 World's Columbian Exposition was called Leave-Taking.

During the Exposition, Miner and Helen Farnsworth Mears were both named artists-in-residence at the Wisconsin Building. At that time, Miner was commissioned to create a work of art representing the state. The result was her most famous work, Forward, which was later given the honor of a prominent position at the Wisconsin State Capitol.

References

Citations

Bibliography 
 
 

1866 births
1967 deaths
Sculptors from Wisconsin
20th-century American sculptors
19th-century American sculptors
American women sculptors
19th-century American women artists
20th-century American women artists
People from Menasha, Wisconsin
American centenarians
Women centenarians